Noviherbaspirillum suwonense is a Gram-negative, aerobic, rod-shaped, mesophilic and motile bacterium from the genus of Noviherbaspirillum which has been isolated from air in Suwon in Korea.

References

Burkholderiales
Bacteria described in 2014